The Leotiaceae are a family of fungi in the order Leotiales. Species in this family are saprobic, and have a wide distribution, especially in temperate regions. The family contains 7 genera and 34 species.

References

Leotiomycetes
Taxa named by August Carl Joseph Corda